Suphan Thongsong (born 26 August 1994) is a Thai professional footballer who plays as a centre back for Thai League 1 club Bangkok United and the Thailand national team.

Career statistics

International

Honours
Muangthong United
 Thai League 1: 2016
 Thai League Cup: 2016
 Thailand Champions Cup: 2017

Thailand
 King's Cup: 2016

References

External links
 

1994 births
Living people
Suphan Thongsong
Suphan Thongsong
Association football central defenders
Suphan Thongsong
Suphan Thongsong
Suphan Thongsong
Suphan Thongsong
Suphan Thongsong
2019 AFC Asian Cup players